CJMG-FM is a Canadian radio station located in Penticton, British Columbia. The station, owned by Bell Media and operating at 97.1 FM with 1,800 watts of power, is branded as Move 97.1 and has an adult contemporary format.

Prior to December 27, 2020, CJMG was branded as 97.1 Sun FM with a CHR/Top 40 format.

Former logo

References

External links
Move 97.1
 
 

Jmg
Jmg
Jmg
Radio stations established in 1965
1965 establishments in British Columbia